Marblepsis is a genus of moths in the subfamily Lymantriinae. The genus was described by Hering in 1926.

Species
Marblepsis chionoptera Collenette, 1936 Madagascar
Marblepsis costalis (Swinhoe, 1906) Uganda
Marblepsis crocipes (Boisduval, 1833) Madagascar
Marblepsis dolosa Hering, 1926 Cameroon
Marblepsis ephala Collenette, 1956 Madagascar
Marblepsis flabellaria (Fabricius, 1787) southern Africa
Marblepsis kakamega Collenette, 1937 Kenya
Marblepsis kibwezi (Collenette, 1932) Uganda
Marblepsis lowa Collenette, 1937 Democratic Republic of the Congo
Marblepsis mayotta (Collenette, 1931) Madagascar
Marblepsis micca Collenette, 1956 Madagascar
Marblepsis mona Collenette, 1956 Madagascar
Marblepsis niveola Hering, 1926 Cameroon
Marblepsis nyses (Druce, 1887) western Africa
Marblepsis ochrobasis Collenette, 1938 Madagascar
Marblepsis pirgula Hering, 1926 western Africa
Marblepsis semna Collenette, 1959 Madagascar
Marblepsis tiphia (Swinhoe, 1903) eastern Africa
Marblepsis umbrata Griveaud, 1973 Madagascar
Marblepsis xanthoma (Collenette, 1931) Madagascar

References

Lymantriinae